Joyce Barry (March 1919 – 23 November 1999) was an Australian cyclist who held numerous records for long-distance cycling, most notably the women's seven-day record.

Biography
Barry was born in March 1919, the third daughter of Mr and Mrs James Barry.

In 1936 the 17-year-old Barry announced her intention to challenge the Sydney to Melbourne record of 3 days 1 hour, set in 1935 by Billie Samuel, and she soon came to the attention of Hubert Opperman. Barry was sponsored by Malvern Star and the NSW Milk Board.

Along the way established a new record of Sydney to Albury in 33 hrs 55 mins and Albury to Melbourne in 16 hrs 52 mins. Once again Malvern Star were quick to promote her success.

The following year Barry traveled to Tasmania, setting a record in May 1938 for the ride from Launceston to Hobart and return, covering  in 17 hrs 30 min 30 sec.

Her record was eclipsed in November 1939 by the next Malvern Star woman rider, Valda Unthank who rode .

Barry died in November 1999, aged 80.

References

1919 births
Australian female cyclists
Cyclists from Sydney
1999 deaths